Karl Eberhard Zwicker (15 January 1924, in Öhringen, Germany – 22 November 1990, in Icking)
was a German acoustics scientist and full professor at the Technical University of Munich.

In 1967 he was appointed full professor of the newly founded Institute for Electro-Acoustics of the Technical University of Munich.

Zwicker developed a method for the computation of loudness, which became a German standard, DIN 45631.

Zwicker, together with Richard Feldtkeller, was author of the standard work for psychoacoustics Das Ohr als Nachrichtenempfänger. (The Ear as Message Receiver).

In 1964, at Bell Labs, he discovered the Zwicker tone auditory illusion.

Literature 
Die Grenzen der Hörbarkeit der Amplituden- und Frequenzmodulation von Tönen und ihre Berücksichtigung in der Übertragungstechnik und der Hörphysiologie. Dissertation, Stuttgart 1952
Die elementaren Grundlagen zur Bestimmung der Informationskapazität des Gehörs. In: Acustica. Band 6, 1956, S. 365–381, Habilitationsschrift, 1956
with Richard Feldtkeller: Das Ohr als Nachrichtenempfänger. Hirzel, Stuttgart 1956; 2. Auflage, Hirzel, Stuttgart 1967
with Ernst Terhardt als Herausgeber: Facts and models in hearing. Proceedings of the Symposium on Psychophysical Models and Physiological Facts in Hearing. Held at Tutzing, Oberbayern, April 22–26, 1974. Springer, Berlin [u.a.] 1974
Psychoakustik. Springer, Berlin [u.a.] 1982, 
with Manfred Zollner: Elektroakustik. Springer, Berlin [u.a.] 1984, ; 3. Springer, Berlin [u.a.] 1993, 
with Hugo Fastl: Psychoacoustics. Facts and models. Springer, Berlin [u.a.] 1990, ; 3. Auflage, Springer, Berlin [u.a.] 2007, 
Karl Eberhard Zwicker. 15.1.1924 – 22.11.1990. Feldpostbriefe aus dem Zweiten Weltkrieg an seine Eltern Wilhelm und Luise Zwicker und seinen Bruder Ulrich. Bis, Univ., Oldenburg 1993, 
DIN 45631, Berechnung des Lautstärkepegels aus dem Geräuschspektrum. Verfahren nach Eberhard Zwicker
Herman A. O. Wilms: In Memoriam. Eberhard Zwicker. In: J. Audio Eng. Soc. Band 39, Nr. 3, März 1991, S. 199–200

External links

German acoustical engineers
People from Öhringen
Academic staff of the Technical University of Munich
1924 births
1990 deaths
Engineers from Baden-Württemberg